Jean Sherman Chatzky (born September 7, 1964) is an American journalist, a personal finance columnist, financial editor of NBC’s TODAY show, AARP’s personal finance ambassador, and the founder and CEO of the multimedia company HerMoney.

Early life and education
Born in Michigan and raised in Wisconsin, Indiana and West Virginia, Chatzky holds a BA in English from the University of Pennsylvania. Her father was a college professor. Her family is Jewish.

Career
Starting her career in 1986 at Working Woman, Chatzky rose from editorial assistant to the assistant editor. In 1989 she left journalism and joined the equity research department of Dean Witter Reynolds, returning to journalism two years later as a reporter/researcher at Forbes. She moved to the Dow Jones/Hearst start-up SmartMoney in 1992, rising from staff writer to senior editor. After a five-year run, Chatzky joined Money Magazine in 1998.

Chatzky has appeared on Oprah, Live With Regis and Kelly, The View and other programs. She has written for Parents, Seventeen, Cosmopolitan, was a staff writer for SmartMoney and a fact checker for Forbes.

Chatzky is also the financial editor for NBC's Today Show. Jean also maintains a daily blog on her website. In 2011 Chatzky became the director of education and editor in chief for the financial advice site SavvyMoney.com.

In 2018, she launched HerMoney, a multimedia company changing the relationships women have with money — inspired by her weekly podcast, HerMoney with Jean Chatzky.

Chatzky is a best-selling author. Her 2017 book with Michael F. Roizen AgeProof: Living Longer Without Running Out of Money or Breaking a Hip, became a New York Times and Wall Street Journal bestseller. Her book Women with Money: The Judgment-Free Guide to Creating the Joyful, Less Stressed, Purposeful (and, Yes, Rich) Life You Deserve was published by Grand Central Publishing in March 2019.

In early 2015, Chatzky and the division of Time Inc., Time for Kids, launched a magazine called Your $ to teach financial literacy to fourth, fifth, and sixth graders. The PwC Charitable Foundation provided financial support for the magazine, which had the goal of reaching 2 million American students. In January 2022, Chatzky and journalist Soledad O'Brien began hosting Everyday Wealth with Soledad O'Brien and Jean Chatzky, a weekly radio program and podcast on personal finance. It is sponsored by Edelman Financial Engines.

Personal life
In May 2009, Chatzky married magazine executive Eliot Kaplan in Irvington, New York. She supports various service groups, and is on the advisory committee for the annual University of Pennsylvania Nora Magid Mentorship Prize, established in 2003 by investigative journalist Stephen Fried and her husband. The prize is given to a senior who shows exceptional ability and promise in writing, reporting, or editing. She is also on the Communications Committee for the University of Pennsylvania.

She is a resident of Briarcliff Manor, New York, where her former husband Peter Chatzky served as mayor.

Works
The Difference: How Anyone Can Prosper in Even The Toughest Times (March 2009)
Make Money, Not Excuses (March 2008)
Pay It Down: From Debt to Wealth on $10 A Day (January 2006). 
The Ten Commandments of Financial Happiness (January 2005)
Talking Money (January 2001)
Not Your Parents' Money Book: Making, Saving and Spending Your Own Money (August 2010)
Money rules: the simple path to lifelong security (2012).

Awards and recognition
Chatzky received the Clarion Award for magazine columns from the Association for Women in Communications in 2002, and her radio show received a Gracie Award from the American Women in Radio and Television in 2012. She has also been nominated twice as part of a three-person writing team each time for National Magazine Awards in Personal Service, and was named one of the best magazine columnists in the country by the Chicago Tribune in 2003 for her writing in Money. In 2009, the Consumer Federation of America awarded Chatzky the Betty Furness Consumer Media Service Award for her nearly two decades of pioneering personal finance education.

References

External links

HerMoney podcast

1964 births
Living people
American business and financial journalists
American business writers
Women business writers
American financial commentators
American finance and investment writers
American magazine editors
American motivational speakers
Women motivational speakers
American motivational writers
Women motivational writers
American newspaper editors
American television reporters and correspondents
American television writers
American magazine staff writers
Journalists from Michigan
People from Briarcliff Manor, New York
University of Pennsylvania alumni
NBC News people
Women newspaper editors
American women non-fiction writers
Screenwriters from Michigan
Screenwriters from New York (state)
Women magazine editors
American women television writers
American women television journalists
Women business and financial journalists
21st-century American women